The Pearl Jam 1991 United States Tour was a concert tour by the American rock band Pearl Jam. It was the band's first tour since taking the name "Pearl Jam".

History
The band embarked on this tour after finishing the mixing sessions for its debut album Ten in England. The short tour of the United States focused on the East Coast. This was the band's only tour with drummer Matt Chamberlain. Chamberlain left the band following this tour and the filming of the "Alive" video on August 3, 1991, in Seattle, Washington at RKCNDY to join the Saturday Night Live band. For his replacement, Chamberlain suggested drummer Dave Abbruzzese, who joined the group and played the rest of Pearl Jam's live shows supporting the Ten album. Chamberlain said, "I toured in the van with them, played a bunch of clubs—I had a good time, definitely had a good time. They wanted me to join the band, but Edie Brickell & New Bohemians had just broke up, I had just got off the road after touring for four years straight—I could not imagine doing it again."

Tour dates
Information taken from various sources.

Band members
Jeff Ament – bass guitar
Stone Gossard – rhythm guitar
Mike McCready – lead guitar
Eddie Vedder – lead vocals
Matt Chamberlain – drums

Songs performed
Originals
"Alive"
"Alone"
"Black"
"Breath"
"Deep"
"Even Flow"
"Garden"
"Jeremy"
"Oceans"
"Once"
"Porch"
"State of Love and Trust"
"Wash"
"Why Go"

References

1991 concert tours
Pearl Jam concert tours